Trinacria is an extinct genus of diatoms present during the early Eocene, named for its triskelion shape.

References

†
Prehistoric SAR supergroup genera

Fossil algae